Walter Little (March 25, 1877 – May 31, 1961) was a Canadian politician. He represented the riding of Timiskaming in the House of Commons of Canada from 1935 to 1953. He was a member of the Liberal Party until his death in 1961.

External links
 

1877 births
1961 deaths
Liberal Party of Canada MPs
Members of the House of Commons of Canada from Ontario